Michael Howard (born 8 March 1965) is a former Australian rules footballer who played with Melbourne in the Victorian Football League (VFL).

Notes

External links 
		
DemonWiki page

1965 births
Australian rules footballers from Victoria (Australia)
Melbourne Football Club players
Living people